Muhammad ibn Abi Hudhayfa (Arabic: محمد بن أبي حذيفة ) was the son of Abu Hudhayfa ibn 'Utba and Sahla bint Suhail. Since his father adopted Salim Mawla Abi Hudhayfa as his son, Muhammad ibn Abi Hudhayfa and Salim Mawla Abi Hudhayfa may be considered as adopted brothers.

In 656, he became the Governor of Egypt by ousting Abdallah ibn Sa'ad. He was born in Abyssinia during Muhammad's life. His father and adopted brother were both martyred in al-Yamama, after which he was raised by 'Uthman ibn 'Affan. He played part in the revolt against 'Uthman when the latter refused to appoint him as ruler for any province.

External links

7th-century births
7th-century Egyptian people
Year of birth missing
Year of death missing
Rashidun governors of Egypt
7th-century Arabs
Banu Abd Shams